Eobasileus cornutus ("horned dawn-king") was a prehistoric species of dinocerate mammal.

Description 

It looked much like the related Uintatherium. Like Uintatherium, it had three pairs of blunt horns on its skull, possibly covered with skin like the ossicones of a giraffe. The frontal pair may have been composed of keratin, like the horn(s) of a rhinoceros. Eobasileus also had a pair of tusks shielded by bony protrusions of the lower jaw.

A dispute over Eobasileus specifically and the uintatheres more generally helped to spark the Bone Wars between Edward Drinker Cope and Othniel Charles Marsh. Cope, Marsh, and Joseph Leidy independently discovered specimens from related species—though Cope and Marsh believed they had each discovered the same species—in the Fort Bridger area, leading to disputes over naming rights for the animals and a series of increasingly hostile letters to various scientific journals. In 1873, for example, Marsh wrote "Cope has endeavored to secure priority by sharp practice, and failed…Prof. Cope's errors will continue to invite correction, but these, like his blunders, are hydra-headed, and life is really too short to spend valuable time in such an ungracious task, especially as in the present case Prof. Cope has not even returned thanks for the correction of nearly half a hundred errors…" The American Naturalist declined to print this letter as a scientific article, but did publish it as an appendix; Marsh paid for its inclusion in the journal.

References 

Dinoceratans
Eocene mammals of North America
Fossil taxa described in 1872
Eocene United States
Prehistoric placental genera